Tenane, also Tenan, is a village on the north coast of Maré Island, in the Loyalty Islands of New Caledonia. It overlooks Nord Bay, just to the southwest of Thogone.

References

Populated places in Maré Island